Wandering Papas is a 1926 American comedy film starring Clyde Cook, featuring Oliver Hardy, and directed by Stan Laurel.

Cast
 Clyde Cook as The camp cook
 Oliver Hardy as The foreman (as Babe Hardy)
 Sue O'Neill as Susie, the hermit's daughter
 Tyler Brooke as Onion, a bridge engineer
 Adolph Milar as The hermit (as Adolph Millar)

See also
 List of American films of 1926

References

External links

1926 films
Silent American comedy films
American silent short films
American black-and-white films
Films directed by Stan Laurel
1926 short films
American comedy short films
1926 comedy films
1920s American films